Walkerville is a name given to several places:

Australia
Town of Walkerville, a local government area in South Australia
Walkerville, South Australia, a suburb in north-eastern Adelaide
Walkerville, Victoria, a town in southwest Gippsland
Canada
Walkerville, Ontario, a former company town that grew around the distillery built by Hiram Walker
Walkerville, Nova Scotia
South Africa
Walkerville, Gauteng
United Kingdom
Walkerville, North Yorkshire, in England
Walkerville, Walker, Newcastle Upon Tyne, in England
United States
Walkerville, Indiana
Walkerville, Michigan
Walkerville, Montana

In education
Walkerville Collegiate Institute, a high school in Windsor, Ontario, Canada

In entertainment
Walkerville (fictional), the setting of the Magic School Bus cartoon series

See also
Walkersville (disambiguation)